Čretež pri Krškem is a small settlement in the hills above the right bank of the Sava River west of the town of Krško in eastern Slovenia. The area is part of the traditional region of Lower Carniola. It is now included with the rest of the municipality in the Lower Sava Statistical Region.

Name
The name of the settlement was changed from Čretež to Čretež pri Krškem in 1953. In the past the German name was Tschretesch.

References

External links
Čretež pri Krškem on Geopedia

Populated places in the Municipality of Krško